St Mary's Church, Bow was a Church of England parish church in Bromley St Leonard's in east London. 'Bromley St Leonard's' was split from the parish of Stepney in 1536, reusing the priory church from the recently dissolved St Leonard's Priory, a Benedictine nunnery. It was destroyed by bombing in World War II and obliterated by the building of the Blackwall Tunnel approach road, dividing the main residential body of the parish from the river front, though its churchyard survives.

References

Bromley St Leonard's
Bromley St Leonard's
Bromley St Leonard's
Demolished buildings and structures in London